Udawalawe (also known as Udawalawa) is a small town located in the southern part of the Ratnapura District in Sri Lanka. It is situated in close to the district's boundary with the Hambantota District and Monaragala District. 

The town is the main entry point into the Udawalawe National Park which is a major National Park in Sri Lanka which is renowned for its high population of wild Asian elephants.

The town is also notable, because of the Udawalawe Reservoir, which was created in 1969, following the construction of a  dam and a  hydro-electric plant on the Walawe river. The reservoir is the third largest reservoir in Sri Lanka.

See also
 Udawalawe National Park
 Udawalawe Dam

References

Populated places in Sabaragamuwa Province